The Hood is a fictional criminal and terrorist and the recurring villain of the 1960s puppet television series Thunderbirds and its adaptations. He is the primary antagonist of the International Rescue organisation, founded by Jeff Tracy. In the original series, the character possesses powers of hypnosis and telepathy and uses an array of disguises to carry out his activities undetected. He operates from a temple in the Malaysian jungle.

In most of his original series appearances, the Hood's objectives are to steal International Rescue's technological secrets and make a fortune by selling them to the criminal underworld. To this end, he repeatedly manipulates the organisation into situations that enable him to film the Thunderbird craft. Due to his opponents' quick thinking, or sometimes his own recklessness, the Hood's schemes invariably fail and all of his camera footage is destroyed. However, he is never captured and International Rescue remain ignorant of his identity.

The alias "Hood" originates in Thunderbirds comic strips and other tie-in media; in the series itself, the character is unnamed except in two episodes ("Martian Invasion" and "Edge of Impact") where he adopts the aliases "Agent Seven-Nine" and "Six-Seven-One". In the 2004 film adaptation, his real name is Trangh Belegant.

Background
The name "Hood" was derived from the term hoodlum. Gerry Anderson also observed that the character was frequently masked, and that a mask "could be described as a 'hood'." Sylvia Anderson acknowledges that the Hood's appearances became less regular towards the end of the series (he does not feature in any episodes of the second season), explaining that, like Kyrano, the character "turned out to be less viable on the screen than on the page." To strengthen the character's antagonistic appearance, the puppet was fitted with an oversized head and hands.

In the 2004 live-action film adaptation, the Hood's actions are motivated by a personal vendetta against Jeff Tracy after he left the Hood for dead during a rescue operation. Actor Ben Kingsley, who played the re-imagined Hood, described the character as a "vengeful obsessive, a man who is determined to discredit the hero that did not save his life. So although he could be a hero to the rest of the world, I know the Achilles' heel and I want that obsessive quest to be fulfilled." The reason for the Hood’s hatred of Jeff was changed in the remake, Thunderbirds Are Go! where he explained how he and Jeff were friends but Jeff wouldn’t allow the Hood to carry out his plans.

Appearances

Original TV series and 1960s films
The character appears in six episodes of the original Thunderbirds: "Trapped in the Sky", "The Mighty Atom", "Martian Invasion", "Edge of Impact", "Desperate Intruder" and "Cry Wolf".

His precise origins are unknown. While it is known that he is the half-brother of Kyrano, the precise details of their relationship – such as which parent they share or which of them is the elder – remain a mystery, as does the origin of his mysterious hypnotic powers. Even his real name remains a mystery; throughout the TV series, he is only ever referred to as "Agent Seven-Nine" and "671", and each codename is used on one occasion only ("Agent Seven-Nine" when he is working for "General X", a military officer from an unspecified eastern European country, and "671" when he is working for General Bron). Instead, the name was revealed in spin-off media and tie-in promotional materials.

What is known for certain about the Hood is that he possesses a significant reputation among the less ethical groups of the world, as he has been shown to be in contact with spy agencies and militaries seeking information or for a target to be eliminated, such as in the episode "Edge of Impact", in which when he is hired by a general to sabotage the Red Arrow program as it was a threat to his work. He regularly spends his time in an Aztec-themed temple in the heart of a Malaysian jungle, which features a statue of Kyrano in front of which he regularly stands when communicating with his brother, as well as other high-tech equipment that he uses to monitor his enemies and prepare his plans.

However, his driving goal is to discover the secrets of the Thunderbirds machines and use them for his own goals. To this end he has been known to create several disasters in an attempt to photograph their machines in action, such as sabotaging the Fireflashs maiden flight by planting a bomb, causing actors for a film to be trapped in a cave, or attempting to sneak a miniature camera in the form of a mouse into Thunderbird 2 after triggering a nuclear reactor meltdown. However, these plans invariably failed, either through direct intervention on the part of International Rescue and their agents or through his own mistakes; for example, when he sent the mouse-like camera into Thunderbird 2, its program (to photograph movement) caused it to instead photograph the screaming Lady Penelope, who had wanted to see the Tracy brothers in action and thus accompanied Virgil, rather than Thunderbird 2's controls.

Although capable of coming up with sophisticated plans- many of which showed little to no regard for the innocent people, setting up several high-stakes rescue missions without any sign of concern for those who would be endangered in the process so long as he got what he wanted-, the Hood was commonly shown to have a short temper and be very poor at improvisation when his schemes didn't work out the way he had planned. On one occasion when he actually managed to obtain footage of Thunderbirds 1 and 2 in action, the subsequent pursuit after they learned someone had been filming them culminated in the Hood stealing a plane with engine trouble that he had no idea how to fly resulting in the plane crashing and the film being destroyed, reflecting his inability to consider alternative plans if his original one failed. His arrogance is also a noteworthy handicap; when attempting to escape the scene after his sabotage of the Red Arrow project was uncovered, he crashed through a roadblock assuming that it had been erected to stop him, only to realise too late that it had actually been to stop people from driving over a damaged bridge.

Although he and the team never came face-to-face in the series – save for when he hypnotised Brains and Tintin to learn the location of a lost treasure – the Tracy brothers were nevertheless aware of his existence. Having thwarted his plan in "Martian Invasion", Virgil commented that he was convinced that "Studt" (the Hood's alias at the time) was the same person who'd been after them since they first began the rescue business, with Scott agreeing with the assessment but nevertheless confident that they would one day capture him.

In the first feature film, Thunderbirds Are Go, the Hood was unmasked and exposed by Scott as he was attempting to infiltrate the new Zero-X spaceship, having unintentionally sabotaged the original one two years previously while attempting to photograph it. His helicopter was shot down by Lady Penelope during his escape and he is seemingly killed, although many fans note that the Hood had faced such seemingly certain-death situations before and always survived.

In the second feature film, Thunderbird 6, there is a villain known only as "Black Phantom". There has been an ongoing debate as to whether this is actually the Hood or not. The marionette that plays "Black Phantom" is that of the Hood, but with hair. This could be the Hood in disguise and "Black Phantom" maybe another alias. His voice however is different (due to voice actor Gary Files replacing Ray Barrett). On the Thunderbird 6 DVD commentary, director David Lane jokes that "Black Phantom" is the "son of the Hood". Sylvia Anderson states that "Black Phantom" is a different character. He is killed when Thunderbirds 1 and 2 open fire and destroy the "Black Phantom" hideout, which is a disused airfield near Casablanca in Morocco.

Comics
During his appearances in the comics, the Hood's plans became even more daring, with some plots even seeing him coming into direct contact with the Tracy family. On one particularly memorable occasion he attempted to expose International Rescue's location by bombing Thunderbird 2's hangar, forcing Virgil to move the craft onto the runway where he subsequently took photographs of the vessel. During the subsequent cover-up attempt – claiming that Tracy Island was simply a theme park based on International Rescue, Thunderbirds 1 and 2 were sent into space with Thunderbird 5 while Lady Penelope and Parker staged a rescue, the intention being for the Thunderbirds to arrive at the scene and thus confirm that they hadn't come from Tracy Island – the Hood managed to infiltrate the island, nearly hypnotising John and Brains, but was captured and had the last week or so of his memory erased to preserve the Tracy family's secret.

On another occasion he managed to capture Brains by faking his death to use his genius to launch a direct assault on Tracy Island, but Gordon was able to track and rescue Brains in time to thwart the Hood's last attack, subsequently capturing the Hood and erasing his memory again.

Another occasion featured him setting up three satellites that allowed him to take control of Thunderbirds 1 and 2 via remote, but Thunderbird 1 was able to escape his control and Thunderbird 3 subsequently destroyed one of the satellites and ruined the network when he attempted to do the same to Thunderbird 2. A later plan featured him hypnotising Kyrano to ask him to come to Tracy Island, but the Tracy's security measures proved sufficient for them to realise what he was up to and halt his attempts to access the Thunderbird hangars.

2004 film

In the live-action film Thunderbirds, where he was portrayed by Ben Kingsley, the Hood's actions against International Rescue were far more direct; having tracked them to Tracy Island, he trapped Jeff Tracy and the four eldest brothers on Thunderbird 5 with a missile attack, subsequently proceeding to steal Thunderbird 2 and the Mole and use them in an attempt to rob the Bank of England. The nature of his powers also changed; while he no longer appeared to possess his hypnotic powers, he now possessed powerful telekinetic abilities, although over-use of this power weakened him. The Hood tells Brains that "I was born with my powers."

It was revealed during the film that the Hood was left for dead during one of International Rescue's first missions; the Hood accuses Jeff Tracy of leaving him to die, but Jeff later tells Alan that, at the time, he left the Hood because he could see no way to save him that wouldn't kill them both. Despite what the Hood had done to him and his family, however, when faced with the chance to let the Hood fall into the Mole's drilling mechanisms, Alan instead saved him when the Hood was weakened by over-use of his powers, subsequently allowing the authorities to place him in custody.

In the film he is actually called the Hood, with Parker pointing out "Sounds like an alias, milady." and Lady Penelope saying his real name is Trangh Belagant. This is in sharp contrast with the original series where he is never named on-screen by either his alias or real name. In the film both he himself and the other characters refer to him by his alias "the Hood".

2015 series

In the CGI 2015 series, the Hood is portrayed as having been secretly after International Rescue for some time, but his existence was apparently more of a rumour and theory rather than confirmed knowledge as far as the Tracy brothers are concerned. He is confirmed to be Kayo's uncle, but only Jeff and Grandma Tracy were aware of her ties to the Hood. It is also suggested that the Hood is responsible for Jeff Tracy's disappearance and possible demise, as Jeff was apparently investigating reports of the Hood before his ship vanished, with Lady Penelope having identified seven different aliases of the Hood before Jeff vanished and the trail went cold. Unlike the original series, the Hood uses holographic projections for his disguises as opposed to conventional means such as masks.

In the first-season finale, "Legacy", the Hood manages to infiltrate Tracy Island and seize control of the Thunderbirds. He also reveals to the Tracy brothers that he is Kayo's uncle and claims she is working for him to undermine their trust in her. However, Kayo tricks him into seizing nearby Mateo Island instead of Tracy Island, and Thunderbirds 1, 2, and 5 destroy his ship before he can escape. The season ends with his capture by the Global Defence Force, but the second season sees him escape from prison mid-season with the assistance of the Mechanic.

After a couple of other appearances in the second half of this season, he allows himself to be rescued/captured by International Rescue to escape the Mechanic's attack, but after Brains is able to convince the Mechanic to stand down in return for the GDF attempting to remove an implant in the Mechanic's brain that forces him to obey the Hood so long as they are within a certain distance from each other, the Hood escapes while being taken back to the GDF prison.

In the third season, the Hood has devised a new means of causing trouble for International Rescue in the form of 'the Chaos Crew', brother and sister Fuse and Havoc, who pilot their own advanced vehicles to create destruction and further the Hood's plans. This ultimately culminates in finding Jeff Tracy in outer space, though Jeff saw through his disguise as Brains. It was revealed that the Hood used to be friends with Jeff, but broke off when he was restricted in his plans by him. The Hood was then recaptured and placed under permanent arrest.

NES Game
Thunderbirds was adapted for one game for the NES; in it, the Hood threatens to bombard the earth with meteors if the Tracy family doesn't give him all of the Thunderbird vehicles within 60 days.  After the period is up, the family defeats him.

Powers and abilities

TV series and comics
Throughout the original series, the Hood was shown to be a master of disguise, using various masks to try and discover the secrets of the Thunderbirds machines and carry out various missions. He also possessed strange hypnotic powers of unknown origin, although these abilities were apparently limited to making people carry out simple commands, such as to follow him or put them to sleep. He was also apparently unable to use these powers to acquire information; on one occasion he attempted to force Brains to tell him the location of a lost treasure by burying him up to his neck in sand and sunlight and depriving him of water rather than simply hypnotising him to learn the answer, suggesting that he cannot make people tell him information but simply make them carry out certain actions.

The only exception to this ability has been when he hypnotises Kyrano, as he was able to make Kyrano tell him such information as when International Rescue would be ready to start operating or where the organisation's headquarters was located. These abilities were apparently aided by a statue of Kyrano he had in his temple, as he always stood in front of it when making contact with his brother. He was also able to implant post-hypnotic suggestions to make Kyrano carry out certain actions when the Hood was no longer in direct 'contact' with him, such as when he had Kyrano disable the automatic camera detectors prior to the rescue in "Martian Invasion" so that he could photograph the Thunderbirds without them knowing. Although these hypnotic attacks always have a significant effect on Kyrano, causing him to collapse to the ground in pain before he is finally forced to reveal the information the Hood seeks, it would appear that Kyrano is not consciously aware of these assaults, as he always passes them off as mere 'dizzy spells' in their aftermath despite his otherwise unquestionable loyalty to Jeff Tracy.

In the 2015 series, the Hood has not demonstrated any of his hypnotic abilities, but retains his knack for cunning plans, and was shown to command significant resources, possessing at least three henchmen, a large flying machine, and the technical resources necessary to create and distribute a large number of earthquake-inducing machines around the bottom of the Pacific Ocean.

Film
In the film, the Hood's abilities were changed to telekinesis, allowing him to levitate himself and move objects, although his temporary control of Lady Penelope and Parker's bodies when they attempted to rescue the Tracys suggests that he retained at least some of his old hypnotic powers. However, over-use of these abilities weakened him, and—in a marked contrast to the series—his niece Tin-Tin (Vanessa Hudgens) was also shown to possess these abilities, although she only ever used them to help her friends; she even managed to overpower her uncle in a duel, although he had been weakened by over-using his powers while fighting Alan.

Reception
The authors of The Rough Guide to Cult TV view the character as an update of Masterspy from the earlier Supermarionation series Supercar. To John Peel, the Hood marks a progression from the "silly, stereotyped" villains of Supercar, Fireball XL5 and Stingray: "Most of his appearances were quite serious, and he was lethally rather than comically inclined." Ian Haywood describes the Hood as "both an absolute and an ethnic villain, whose jungle temple is a demonic reflection of the Tracy Island, and a signifier of the yellow peril of the Cold War". For Jonathan Bignell, the character's villainy transcends conventional geopolitical boundaries: his Eastern appearance and exotic powers "associated him with James Bond villains of the period, and pervasive fears of China as a 'third force' antagonistic to the West." Nicholas J. Cull likens the Hood to "an evil version of Yul Brynner [as the King of Siam] in The King and I".

Jon Abbott of TV Zone magazine calls the Hood a "rather weak villain" who exists "because the show simply needs a bad guy" and whose goal of photographing the Thunderbird machines would seem "hilarious" to newer audiences. Abbott also believes that the character represents a negative ethnic stereotype, writing that the "use of a foreign culture to create a sinister atmosphere [...] dates the show badly" and that while Gerry Anderson often avoided casting Russians as the enemy in his 1960s productions, he seemingly "missed the point where it comes to the Orient." Marcus Hearn believes the Hood's supernatural powers to be at odds with the series' technological focus: "In a format devoted to realistic or at least feasible presentations of scientific and engineering concepts, the episodes featuring this Oriental magician sometimes strike an incongruous note." He states that these attributes make the Hood the "most problematic" regular cast member and views the character's secret relation to Kyrano as one of the series' main weaknesses. Hearn also notes that the Hood appears less often in later episodes, suggesting that he was not a favourite of the writers.

Ben Kingsley's portrayal of the Hood in the 2004 live-action film has drawn a mixed critical response. Glenn Erickson of the review website DVD Talk writes that Kingsley plays the role with "complete actorly overkill" and likens the characterisation to that of a clichéd "evil baddie". He argues that the script uses ethnic stereotyping in its depiction of the Hood and his relatives, the Kyrano family, noting that both the Hood and his half-niece Tin-Tin possess hypnotic powers that constitute "inscrutable Oriental wizardry". Alex Hewison of The Digital Fix calls Kingsley's performance "flat and dull, as though the ignominy of having to wear a red kimono and ridiculous face paint was enough to send him into a semi-catatonic state of weary indifference." In contrast, Dennis Prince of DVD Verdict describes Kingsley as "simply excellent, devouring the role of the wicked yet dryly witty criminal mastermind, providing a hiss-worthy baddie who never becomes too evil". Philip Tibbetts of Den of Geek suggests that while the actor "hams it up on occasion", he "manages to restore some menace" to a film that is sometimes "frustratingly infantile".

Carolyn Percy of the Wales Arts Review praises the re-imagined Hood of the remake series, describing him as "much more consistently competent and dangerous" than the original. She applauds the decision to make him British and remove his hypnotic abilities, stating that the original character's Far Eastern tones made him a "racial stereotype" and his supernatural powers "weren't in keeping with the rest of the show."

References

External links
 Thunderbirds characters

British male characters in television
Fictional characters who use magic
Fictional hypnotists and indoctrinators
Fictional Malaysian people
Fictional secret agents and spies
Fictional telekinetics
Fictional telepaths
Fictional terrorists
Film characters introduced in 1966
Indian film characters
Male characters in animated series
Male characters in television
Male film villains
Male supervillains
Television characters introduced in 1965
Television supervillains
Thunderbirds (TV series) characters